The 2013 Supercopa Argentina Final was the 2nd edition of the Supercopa Argentina, an annual football match contested by the winners of the Primera División and Copa Argentina competitions. Vélez Sarsfield beat Arsenal 1–0 in San Luis and won the cup.

Qualified teams

Match

Details

Statistics

References 

2013–14 in Argentine football
Supercopa Argentina
Supercopa Argentina 2013
Supercopa Argentina 2013